Amine El-Domyati (born 14 September 1962) is a Lebanese swimmer. He competed at the 1984 Summer Olympics and the 1988 Summer Olympics.

References

1962 births
Living people
Lebanese male swimmers
Olympic swimmers of Lebanon
Swimmers at the 1984 Summer Olympics
Swimmers at the 1988 Summer Olympics
Place of birth missing (living people)